Al-Shuaibiyah Mosque also known as al-Omari, al-Tuteh and al-Atras mosque, is the oldest mosque in Aleppo, Syria. Built in 637, it is one of the oldest mosques in the Levant. It is located in the western part of the Ancient City of Aleppo, within the historic walls of the city, near the Gate of Antioch.

History
After the fall of Aleppo to the Arabs under Abu Ubaidah ibn al Jarrah in 637, the Al-Shuaibiyah Mosque was built near the gate of Antioch, absorbing the ancient Roman triumphal arch which once marked the beginning of the decumanus.

Renovation
The mosque was renovated by Abu 'l Hasan al-Ghadairi, a Shi'i, during the 10th century. In the 1150s, the Zengid ruler, Nur ad-Din, renovated and transformed it from a Shia mosque into a Shafi'i madrasa for Shaykh Shu'ayb.  It is known for its decorated façade where many 12th-century Kufic inscriptions can be found. The rectangular short minaret reflects the earliest designs in the history of Islamic architecture. The mosque was renovated again in 1401.

During the modern era, the mosque was renovated in 1980 and 1990.

References

Further reading

External links
Al-Shuaibiyah Mosque

Mosques in Aleppo
7th-century mosques